Alfonso López de Avila (died 30 December 1591) was a Roman Catholic prelate who served as the Archbishop of Santafé en Nueva Granada (1591) 
and Archbishop of Santo Domingo (1580–1591).

Biography
Alfonso López de Avila was born in Córdoba, Spain.
On 14 March 1580 he was appointed by the King of Spain and confirmed by Pope Gregory XIII as Archbishop of Santo Domingo. 
On 29 November 1591 he was appointed by the King of Spain and confirmed by Pope Innocent IX as Archbishop of Santafé en Nueva Granada where served until his death on 30 December 1591 in Santo Domingo.

References

External links and additional sources
 (for Chronology of Bishops) 
 (for Chronology of Bishops) 
 (for Chronology of Bishops) 
 (for Chronology of Bishops) 

1591 deaths
Bishops appointed by Pope Gregory XIII
Bishops appointed by Pope Innocent IX
Roman Catholic archbishops of Santo Domingo
Roman Catholic archbishops of Bogotá
16th-century Roman Catholic bishops in New Granada
16th-century Roman Catholic archbishops in the Dominican Republic